The 2023 season will be the Baltimore Ravens' 28th in the National Football League (NFL) and their 16th under head coach John Harbaugh. They will be attempting to improve on their 10–7 record from the previous season, and to clinch their first AFC North title since 2019.

Offseason

Players lost

Draft

Draft trades

Staff

Coaching changes

Current roster

Preseason
The Ravens' preseason opponents and schedule will be announced in the spring.

Regular season

2023 opponents
Listed below are the Ravens' opponents for 2023. Exact dates and times will be announced in the spring.

References

External links
 

Baltimore
Baltimore Ravens seasons
Baltimore Ravens
2020s in Baltimore